The 2007 AFL Women's National Championships took place in Canberra, Australian Capital Territory, Australia. The tournament began on 11 June and ended on 16 July 2006. The 2006 tournament was the 16th Championship, the previous one being held in Sydney in 2006. The Senior-vics of Victoria won the 2006 Championship, defeating Western Australia in the final. It was Victoria's 15th successive title.

Ladder
  Victoria-Senior
  Western Australia
  Queensland
  Victoria-U19
  Australian Capital Territory
  Northern Territory
  South Australia
  New South Wales
 Australian Defence Force

All-Australian Team 2007
VIC Seniors: Michelle Dench (Melb Uni), Elizabeth Skinner (Melb Uni) Shannon McFerran (St Albans), Meg Hutchins (Deakin), Lauren Tesoriero (Yarra Valley), Janine Milne (Darebin).
VIC U19's: Daisy Pearce (Darebin), Karen Paxman (Hadfield), Penny Cula-Reid (St Kilda), Moana Hope (Darebin), Lauren Arnell (Darebin).
ACT: Kirsten Ireland (Riverina)
ADF: Emma Hender (Eastlake)
NSW: Talei Owen (UNSW/Easts)
NT: Michaeline Brown (St Mary's)
QLD: Katherine Pender (Centrals); Aasta O'Connor (Logan); Joanne Butland (North Cairns)
SA: Michele Reid (Greenacres)
WA: Nikki Harwood (Melville Dockers), Krystle Rivers (Coastal Titans), Louise Knitter (The Hawks), Jodie White (Coastal Titans).

External links
National Results from the AFL site

2007
2007 in Australian rules football
AFL